Kenneth F. Dolan (January 23, 1943 – April 17, 2018) was an American business anchor, author, and radio host.

Ken Dolan was an anchor, along with his wife of 46 years Daria Dolan, for Dolans Unscripted on CNN. They joined CNN in 2003.

They have also written books on personal finance and hosted several money seminars. Prior to joining CNN, the Dolans were contributors to CBS This Morning and CBS News Saturday Morning and hosted their own show on the now-defunct CNNfn, as well as hosting radio programs on the WOR Radio Network and NBC Talknet, helping to establish the personal finance genre of talk radio as a viable and credible medium.

Dolan held a bachelor's degree in marketing from Boston College. He died April 17, 2018, from cancer at age 75.

Publishing history

1994: Straight Talk on Money

References

External links
WOR Radio Net: The Dolans

1943 births
2018 deaths
American finance and investment writers
American male journalists
American radio personalities
Carroll School of Management alumni